NGC 4318 is a small lenticular galaxy located about 72 million light-years away in the constellation Virgo. It was discovered by astronomer John Herschel on January 18, 1828. NGC 4318 is a member of the Virgo W′ group, a group of galaxies in the background of the Virgo Cluster that is centered on the giant elliptical galaxy NGC 4365.

Physical characteristics
NGC 4318 contains a small, classical bulge and a nuclear stellar disc with a diameter of ~. Outside the nuclear stellar disc lies a sharply bounded, low surface brightness region with a diameter of ~ beyond which lies a larger outer disk.

Black Hole
NGC 4318 harbors a supermassive black hole with an estimated mass of 4 million ( M☉) solar masses.

Globular clusters
NGC 4318 is surrounded by 18 globular clusters.

See also
 List of NGC objects (4001–5000)

References

External links

4318
040122
Virgo (constellation)
Astronomical objects discovered in 1828
Lenticular galaxies
07446
Virgo Supercluster